Fanat Kakhramonov (born 23 December 1996) is a Uzbekistani boxer. He competed in the men's middleweight event at the 2020 Summer Olympics.

References

External links
 

1996 births
Living people
Uzbekistani male boxers
Olympic boxers of Uzbekistan
Boxers at the 2020 Summer Olympics
People from Samarkand
20th-century Uzbekistani people
21st-century Uzbekistani people